Seticosta coquimbana is a species of moth of the family Tortricidae. It is found in Coquimbo Region, Chile.

The wingspan is about 18 mm. The ground colour of the forewings is white, strigulated (finely streaked) with greyish. The markings are dark grey. The hindwings are whitish, suffused with pale brownish postmedially.

Etymology
The species name refers to the type locality.

References

Moths described in 2010
Seticosta
Moths of South America
Taxa named by Józef Razowski
Endemic fauna of Chile